Vineeth Mohan. is a Malayalam film actor, he made his debut in Memories. He acted in Peruchazhi, Aadu, Aadu 2, Adi Kapyare Kootamani. He is more popular for his roles in Aadu, Adi Kapyare Kootamani and Aadu 2. He also acted with director Jeethu Joseph's debut acting Ottamooli as co-actor.

Personal life

Vineeth was born at Kollam, Kerala. He completed his schooling at Kendriya Vidhyalaya, Kalamassery and graduated with a Degree in BSc. Mathematics from Union Christian College, Aluva in 2010.

He was a bank employee in Syndicate Bank, and he resigned from the job to pursue a career in acting in 2013.

Filmography

Short films

Awards

References

External links
 
 

Male actors in Malayalam cinema
Indian male film actors
Male actors from Kollam
Living people
Kendriya Vidyalaya alumni
21st-century Indian male actors
1994 births